Bishop Leonard Stephen Scott (born February 28, 1949) is an American gospel musician and pastor of Rock Community Church. He started his music career, in 1989, with Tyscot Records releasing Holy, and they have released all of his albums. Scott has released eleven albums with three of those charting on the Billboard magazine Gospel Albums chart.

Early life
Bishop Scott was born Leonard Stephen Scott, on February 28, 1949, in Indianapolis, Indiana, and founded the Tyscot Records label with L. Craig Tyson to facilitate the promotion of his church choir, Christ Church Apostolic Radio Choir.

Music career
His music recording career started in 1989, with the release of Holy by his label Tyscot Records, and he has released all eleven of his albums with that particular label. The breakthrough release upon the Billboard magazine Gospel Albums chart was Hymns for the Nation in 2004, which charted at No. 39. His album, Hymns & Church Songs Live from Alabama, was released in 2006, and it charted at No. 29. The 2008 album, Be Lifted Up, charted at No. 18.

Discography

References

External links
 Official website
 Bishop Leonard Scott Cross Rhythms Artist Profile

1949 births
Living people
African-American songwriters
African-American Christians
Musicians from Indianapolis
Songwriters from Indiana
21st-century African-American people
20th-century African-American people